The  is the legislature of Yokohama City.

Overview 

Members: 86
Term: 4 years
Voting System: Medium‐size constituency system (Single non-transferable vote)
President: Tomio Shimizu (LDP)
Vice-President: Masaharu Takahashi (Komeito)

Current composition 
As of 2021, the city council was composed as follows:

Electoral districts

Representatives' compensation and benefits

References

External links
 Yokohama City Council 

Yokohama
City councils in Japan